

Men's 200 m Backstroke - Final

Men's 200 m Backstroke - Heats

Men's 200 m Backstroke - Heat 01

Men's 200 m Backstroke - Heat 02

Swimming at the 2006 Commonwealth Games